Unna I is an electoral constituency (German: Wahlkreis) represented in the Bundestag. It elects one member via first-past-the-post voting. Under the current constituency numbering system, it is designated as constituency 144. It is located in the Ruhr region of North Rhine-Westphalia, comprising the southern part of the district of Unna.

Unna I was created for the 1965 federal election. Since 2009, it has been represented by Oliver Kaczmarek of the Social Democratic Party (SPD).

Geography
Unna I is located in the Ruhr region of North Rhine-Westphalia. As of the 2021 federal election, it comprises the municipalities of Bergkamen, Bönen, Fröndenberg, Holzwickede, Kamen, Schwerte, and Unna from the Unna district.

History
Unna I was created in 1965, then known as Unna. It acquired its current name in the 1980 election. In the 1965 through 1976 elections, it was constituency 123 in the numbering system. From 1980 through 1998, it was number 116. From 2002 through 2009, it was number 145. Since 2013, it has been number 144.

Originally, the constituency was coterminous with the Unna district. It acquired its current borders in the 1980 election.

Members
The constituency has been held continuously by the Social Democratic Party (SPD) since its creation. It was first represented by Manfred Schulte from 1965 to 1987. Ulrich Böhme was representative from 1987 to 1998, followed by Rolf Stöckel until 2009. Oliver Kaczmarek was elected in 2009, and re-elected in 2013, 2017, and 2021.

Election results

2021 election

2017 election

2013 election

2009 election

Notes

References

Federal electoral districts in North Rhine-Westphalia
1965 establishments in West Germany
Constituencies established in 1965
Unna (district)